The Military Recognition Medal is a military decoration of the Republic of Austria. Established in 2006, the medal may be awarded to members of the military or civilians for service to the Austrian Armed Forces.

See also
Honours system in Austria

References

External links
MILITÄRISCHES AUSZEICHNUNGSRECHT, Bundesministerium für Landesverteidigung und Sport, 1 January 2014.
Information auf der Seite des Landes Steiermark Militär-Anerkennungsmedaille und Milizmedaille, Information auf der Seite des Landes Steiermark.

Military awards and decorations of Austria